Heptonstall is a civil parish in the metropolitan borough of Calderdale, West Yorkshire, England.   It contains 140 listed buildings that are recorded in the National Heritage List for England.  Of these, seven are at Grade II*, the middle of the three grades, and the others are at Grade II, the lowest grade.  The parish contains the village of Heptonstall and the area to the north and west.  Most of the listed buildings are in the village, and along the valley of Colden Water to the west and the valley of Hebden Water to the northwest.  In the village, most of the listed buildings are houses, cottages and associated structures, and in the valleys they are farmhouses and farm buildings, including laithe houses.  There is a variety of other listed buildings, and these include churches and items in churchyards, a wayside cross, public houses, the remains of stocks, guide posts, bridges, an animal pound, a former watermill, a former Sunday school, the valve tower of a reservoir, and a telephone kiosk.


Key

Buildings

References

Citations

Sources

Lists of listed buildings in West Yorkshire